Gopal Krishna may refer to:
 Gopal Krishna (1929 film), an Indian silent film
 Gopal Krishna (1938 film), a 1938 Bollywood film
 Gopal Krishna (1979 film), a 1979 Bollywood film
 Gopal Krishna (astronomer) (born 1947), Indian radio astronomer